This article may be expanded with text from WikiProject Volleyball:To do – biographies

José Roberto Lages Guimarães (born 31 July 1954), known as Zé Roberto, is a Brazilian former volleyball player and current coach. He currently coaches Grêmio Recreativo Barueri. He played volleyball between years 1967–1988 as a professional player and has coached since 1988. He first coached Brazilian women team Eletropaulo. He competed in the men's tournament at the 1976 Summer Olympics.

He coached Brazil Men between 1992–96 and has coached Brazil Women since 2003. He won Barcelona 1992 with Brazil Men and won Beijing 2008 and London 2012 with Brazil Women.

He coached the women's team in the 2020 Summer Olympics, winning a silver medal.

Career

As a player

As a coach

Individual awards
 2003 - CBV - Best Coach
 2006 - Panamerican Cup - Best Coach
 2013 - Brazilian Olympic Committee - Best Coach of Year
 2014 - FIVB World Grand Prix - Best Coach
 2014 - FIVB World Championship - Fair Play Award

References

External links
  Fenerbahçe Women's Volleyball Official Web Page
  Coach profile on FIVB.org
  Coach profile on arenasport.com

Living people
1954 births
Brazilian men's volleyball players
Olympic volleyball players of Brazil
Brazilian volleyball coaches
Fenerbahçe volleyball coaches
Medalists at the 2012 Summer Olympics
Medalists at the 2008 Summer Olympics
Medalists at the 1992 Summer Olympics
Olympic gold medalists for Brazil
Sportspeople from São Paulo
Volleyball players at the 1976 Summer Olympics